Vayqan (also Romanized as Vāyqān and Vayeqān; also known as Vaighan, Vayagan, and Vāygān) is a city in the Central District of Shabestar County, East Azerbaijan province, Iran. At the 2006 census, its population was 4,091 in 1,095 households. The following census in 2011 counted 4,298 people in 1,273 households. The latest census in 2016 showed a population of 4,678 people in 1,501 households.

References 

Shabestar County

Cities in East Azerbaijan Province

Populated places in East Azerbaijan Province

Populated places in Shabestar County